Axel Gunnar Valter Axelsson (born 30 May 1924) was a Swedish geomorphologist and educator who made significant contributions to the understanding of the delta sedimentology and dynamics. One of his principal study sites was the Laitaure delta in Sarek National Park. In his thesis work on Laitaure delta and Rapaälven Axelsson drew on a hydrological data collection started by Axel Hamberg.

References

1924 births
Possibly living people
Uppsala University alumni
Process geomorphologists
Swedish geomorphologists
Sedimentologists
Swedish hydrologists